The Gottfried-Keller-Preis, prix Gottfried-Keller, or premio Gottfried Keller is one of the oldest literary awards of Switzerland. The prize was created by Martin Bodmer and is named after the Swiss author Gottfried Keller. It is awarded every two to three years.

Laureates

1922 Jakob Bosshart
1925 Heinrich Federer
1927 Charles Ferdinand Ramuz
1929 Josef Nadler
1931 Hans Carossa
1933 Festgabe Universität Zürich
1936 Hermann Hesse
1938 Ernst Gagliardi
1943 Robert Faesi
1947 Fritz Ernst
1949 Rudolf Kassner
1952 Gertrud von Le Fort
1954 Werner Kaegi
1956 Max Rychner
1959 Maurice Zermatten
1962 Emil Staiger
1965 Meinrad Inglin
1967 Edzard Schaper
1969 Golo Mann
1971 Marcel Raymond
1973 Ignazio Silone
1975 Hans Urs von Balthasar
1977 Elias Canetti
1979 Max Wehrli
1981 Philippe Jaccottet
1983 Hermann Lenz
1985 Herbert Lüthy
1989 Jacques Mercanton
1992 Erika Burkart
1994 Gerhard Meier
1997 Giovanni Orelli
1999 Peter Bichsel
2001 Agota Kristof
2004 Klaus Merz
2007 Fabio Pusterla
2010 Gerold Späth
2013 Collective of writers Bern ist überall
2016 Pietro De Marchi
2019 Thomas Hürlimann and Adolf Muschg
2022 Noëlle Revaz

References

External links
 

Swiss literary awards
Awards established in 1922